Events from the year 1994 in Russia.

Incumbents
President: Boris Yeltsin
Prime Minister: Viktor Chernomyrdin 
Minister of Defence: Pavel Grachev

Events

January
3 January – Baikal Airlines Flight 130 crashes, killing all 124 people on board. 
12–15 January – United States – Russia mutual detargeting

September
9 September – The Eurasian Patent Convention is signed.

October
17–20 October 1994 – State visit by Elizabeth II to Russia

November
26 November – Battle of Grozny (November 1994)

December
5 December – The Budapest Memorandum on Security Assurances was signed in Budapest. It included security assurances against threats against the territorial integrity of Ukraine, Belarus and Kazakhstan. 
12 December – Battle of Dolinskoye
28 December – Battle of Khankala

Births
 1 September – 
 Margarita Gasparyan, tennis player
 Anna Smolina, tennis player
 30 September – Aliya Mustafina, artistic gymnast

Deaths
26 August – Vladimir Burich, poet (b. 1932)
 1 November – Moisey Markov, physicist (b. 1908)

References

 
1990s in Russia
Years of the 20th century in Russia
Russia
Russia
Russia